The Silver Princess in Oz (1938) is the thirty-second of the Oz books created by L. Frank Baum and his successors, and the eighteenth written by Ruth Plumly Thompson. It was illustrated by John R. Neill.

In this story, young King Randy of Regalia (from Thompson's The Purple Prince of Oz) is visited by his old friend, Kabumpo, the Elegant Elephant of Pumperdink.   Together, they set out to visit their friend Jinnicky the Red Jinn (also from Purple Prince) in the Land of Ev. On the way, they meet Planetty, the silver Princess from Anuther Planet, and her fire-breathing colt, Thun.  When they reach Jinnicky's palace, they find that Jinnicky has been deposed and enchanted by an untrustworthy slave.

Thompson's novel is notable in that she avoids the use of Baum's classic characters and relies on those of her own invention (as is true of some of her other later books, like Captain Salt in Oz); and also for the fact that author and artist portray the followers of Jinnicky as turbanned black African slaves, with images and language which today could be considered racist.

Planetty and Thun return in Jeff Freedman's 1994 novel The Magic Dishpan of Oz.

References

External links
 The Silver Princess in Oz: Empty-Grave Retrofit Edition
 
 On The Silver Princess in Oz

1938 American novels
1938 children's books
1938 fantasy novels
Jinn in popular culture
Novels about alien visitations
Oz (franchise) books
Books about princesses